A list of films produced in the Soviet Union in 1924 (see 1924 in film).

1924

See also
 1924 in the Soviet Union

External links
 Soviet films of 1924 at the Internet Movie Database

1924
Soviet
Films